Pantelimon "Pan" Halippa (1 August 1883 – 30 April 1979) was a Bessarabian and later Romanian journalist and politician. One of the most important promoters of Romanian nationalism in Bessarabia and of this province's union with Romania, he was president of Sfatul Țării, which voted union in 1918. He then occupied ministerial posts in several governments, following which he underwent political persecution at the hands of the Communist régime and was later incarcerated in Sighet prison.

Biography
Halippa was born to the poor peasants Nicolae and Paraschiva Halippa in Cubolta, then in the Russian Empire and now in Moldova's Raionul Sîngerei.

Married to the teacher Eleonora Circău, he had one son. His Chișinău home is preserved as a monument today.

Education 
Pan Halippa attended primary school in his native village and then took courses at the Yedintsy Spiritual School and the Kishinev Theological Seminary. After graduating from seminary in 1904, he enrolled in the Faculty of Physics and Medicine of the University of Yuryev (today University of Tartu), but a year later the Russian Revolution of 1905 broke out and he was forced to quit university. Back in Kishinev, he became involved with young Romanian intellectuals, working on Revista Basarabia, the first Romanian-language publication in Bessarabia in that period. In its pages he printed the revolutionary hymn "Deșteaptă-te, române!", which caused the Tsarist authorities to seek his arrest.

Taking refuge in Iași, he enrolled in the Faculty of Letters and Philosophy of the University of Iași, where he took classes from 1908 to 1912. At this time he worked on the magazine Viața românească, in which he published "Scrisori din Basarabia" ("Letters from Bessarabia"). In 1908, he published Pilde și novele ("Proverbs and Novels") in Chișinău (using Cyrillic), the first Bessarabian fiction novel, while in 1912 "Basarabia, schiță geografică" ("Bessarabia, Geographic Sketch") appeared. Returning to Chișinău in 1913, he published, together with Nicolae Alexandri and with the assistance of Vasile Stroescu, the newspaper Cuvânt moldovenesc, which he directed after April 1917. He wrote unceasingly in favour of union with Romania.

Political activity 
Halippa's political activity intensified as the 1910s wore on and in 1917 he founded the Moldovan National Party. The year 1918 found him at the head of the unionist wave, for which he was elected first vice-president, then president of Sfatul Țării, the assembly which voted for the union of Bessarabia with Romania on 27 March 1918. He also took parts in the assemblies at Cernăuți and Alba Iulia (Great National Assembly of Alba Iulia), where, respectively, the acts of union of Bukovina and Transylvania with Romania were proclaimed.

After 1918 he held a number of government posts: Minister and Secretary of State for Bessarabia (1919–1920), Minister of Public Works (1927), Minister of Public Works and Communications (1930) interim Minister of Work, Health and Social Protection (1930), Minister Secretary of State (1928–1930, 1932, 1932–1933), senator and deputy in parliament (1918–1934). He was a member of the National Peasants' Party after its founding in 1926.

Throughout his time in office, Halippa sought to further Bessarabia's cultural development. He founded the Chișinău Popular University (1917), the Moldovan Conservatory, the Society of Bessarabian Writers and Journalists and the Luceafărul Editorial Society and Bookstore in Chișinău (1940). In 1932 he edited and headed the magazine Viața Basarabiei ("Bessarabian Life") and the eponymous daily newspaper. In 1918 Halippa was chosen corresponding member of the Romanian Academy; removed in 1948, he was restored to its ranks posthumously in 1990.

In 1950 he was arrested and imprisoned without trial at Sighet prison, in Sighetu Marmației. Two years later he was handed over to the NKVD, taken to Chișinău, tried and sentenced to 25 years' hard labour in Siberia. Brought back to Romania, he was held at Aiud until 1957.

Death 
He died in Bucharest in 1979 at the age of 95 and is buried in the cemetery of Cernica Monastery.

Gallery

Works
Halippa wrote over 280 poems, articles, sketches, translations and memorials, managing to edit a single volume of poetry during his lifetime: Flori de pârloagă ("Flowers of a Fallow Field", 1921, Iași), prefaced by Mihail Sadoveanu. He also wrote a few historical studies: Bessarabiâ do prisoedineniâ k Rossii ("Besarabia before Annexation to Russia") (Russian, 1914); Basarabia sub împăratul Aleksandr I (1812–1825) ("Bessarabia under Emperor Aleksandr I"), B. P. Hasdeu (1939). Posthumous works include Povestea vieții mele ("The Story of My Life", Patrimoniu, Chișinău, 1990) and a volume of newspaper writings (2001). He also collaborated on the work Testament pentru urmași ("Last Will", 1991).

Bibliography
Dorina N. Rusu, Membrii Academiei Române 1866-1999, Editura Academiei Române, Bucharest, 1999 
Biblioteca Națională a Republicii Moldova, "Calendar Național. 2003"

External links
Halippa's file at the Sighet Memorial
 Biblioteca Metropolitană București, Filiala Pantelimon Halippa

Romanian people of Moldovan descent
Anti-Russification activists
Inmates of Aiud prison
People from Sîngerei District
Corresponding members of the Romanian Academy
Romanian magazine editors
Members of the Senate of Romania
Inmates of Sighet prison
Members of the Chamber of Deputies (Romania)
National Peasants' Party politicians
20th-century Romanian politicians
University of Tartu alumni
Alexandru Ioan Cuza University alumni
1883 births
1979 deaths
National Moldavian Party politicians
Moldovan MPs 1917–1918
Presidents of the Moldovan Parliament
Deputy Presidents of the Moldovan Parliament
Bessarabian Peasants' Party politicians
Romanian journalists
Romanian socialists
Moldovan journalists
Male journalists
Ministers for Bessarabia
Romanian Ministers of Communications
Romanian Ministers of Public Works
Romanian Ministers of Labor
Romanian Ministers of Health
People extradited from Romania
People extradited to the Soviet Union
Prisoners and detainees of the Soviet Union
Peasants' Party (Romania) politicians
Romanian nationalists
20th-century journalists
Burials at Cernica Monastery Cemetery